This is a summary of the electoral history of Michael Joseph Savage, Prime Minister of New Zealand (1935–40), Leader of the Labour Party (1933–40), and Member of Parliament for Auckland West (1919–40).

Parliamentary elections

1911 election

1914 election

1919 election

1922 election

1925 election

1928 election

1931 election

1935 election

1938 election

Local-body elections

1919 local-body elections

1921 local-body elections

1927 local-body elections

1929 local-body elections

1931 local-body elections

1933 local-body elections

Leadership elections

1923 Deputy-leadership election

1933 Leadership election

Notes

References

Savage, Michael Joseph